The Raschig process could mean:

 The Raschig process for the production of hydroxylamine
 The Olin Raschig process for the production of hydrazine
 The Raschig–Hooker process for the production of phenol